Agaravelukudi  is a village in the Needamangalam taluk of Tiruvarur district in Tamil Nadu, India.

Demographics 

As per the 2001 census, Agaravelukudi had a population of 1,223 with 618 males and 605 females. The sex ratio was 979. The literacy rate was 71.68.

References 

 

Villages in Tiruvarur district